Baboom was a music service based in Portugal. It was founded by Kim Dotcom, although Baboom and Dotcom severed ties almost a year before the service's launch. Baboom was launched on 17 August 2015. Baboom described the service as a "Music marketplace that combines Fair Trade Streaming with a music store". The service however was quickly put on hold "until further notice", as stated on Baboom's website, even before it could celebrate its first year.

Model 
Baboom's website stated that users can play the music they want on any device, own the music forever, support artists, be part of the "inner circle", and upload their own music.

It also stated the service gives artists 90% of the revenue, fair trade streaming, premium following, a rights management system and a career analytics system.

Russel Brown of the Public Address blog said in a review that:

Apps  
The service supported both iOS and Android. The apps had limited functionality, with the only features being playing and downloading music.

References 

2015 software
Android (operating system) software
Companies based in Porto
Internet properties established in 2015
IOS software
Jukebox-style media players
Kim Dotcom
Online music database clients
Online music stores of Portugal
2015 establishments in Portugal
Portuguese brands